My Santa may refer to:

 Itsudatte My Santa!, a 1998 manga
 My Santa (film), a 2019 Indian Malayalam-language fantasy-comedy thriller